Holcocera anomalella is a moth in the  family Blastobasidae. It is found in the United States, including Arizona.

References

Moths described in 1910
anomalella